The Space Canine Patrol Agents, or SCPA is a group of fictional anthropomorphic extraterrestrial canine superheroes that appeared in stories published by DC Comics.

History
The SCPA first appeared in Superboy (volume 1) #131 (July 1966). Several of the dogs were given alliterative names which also described their powers: i.e. Paws Pooch was able to increase its number of limbs, Prophetic Pup could predict the future using his "crystal ball cranium", Tail Terrier had an elastic tail, etc.

The team was something of a parody of the Legion of Super-Pets, and the Legion of Super-Heroes, with enemies such as the "Phanty Cats".

Their battle cry and sacred oath, with which they began all meetings, was
Big dog, big dog, bow, wow, wow!
We'll stop evil, now, now, now!

The first line parodies the Yale chorus: "Bulldog, bulldog, bow-wow-wow".

They are presumed to have been wiped out of existence after the Crisis on Infinite Earths. They have appeared once in a superhero limbo in Grant Morrison's Animal Man "Monkey Puzzles", where characters that have been written out of continuity reside. While visiting here, Merryman of Inferior Five stated to Animal Man that even if some of these characters may be brought back, times have changed where the Space Canine Patrol Agents (as some of the other animals) will not likely return.

However Krypto's status as the El family dog from Krypton has been restored and The Sandman: Overture issue #3 included a cameo appearance of the "Space Canine Patrol Corps".

Membership
The Space Canine Patrol Agents roster has included:

Tail Terrier: Has an elastic tail that can be used as a rope. "Top Dog" of the SCPA.
Mammoth Mutt: Can inflate to many times his size. Died in his first appearance.
Hot Dog: Pyrokinetic
Tusky Husky: Can turn one of his canine teeth into a long tusk, which is used as a lever.
Bull Dog: Can grow horns.
Paw Pooch: Can grow additional limbs.
Chameleon Collie: Shapeshifter
Prophetic Pup: Clairvoyant
Krypto: Similar powers to Superman.
Mammoth Miss: Mammoth Mutt's girlfriend, with the same powers.
Beam Beagle: Possessed "searchlight eyes". Died in the line of duty.
Rex the Wonder Dog: Similar powers and appearance in fur colour to Krypto but is an earth white shepherd dog from U.S. Army's K-9 Corps instead.
Pooch: Rex's brother who is also from the U.S. Army's K-9 Corps.
Streak the Wonder Dog: Alan Scott's pet dog.
Wonder Dog: The pet of Marvin and Wendy Kuttler who are members of the Teen Titans.
Streaky the Supercat: Similar powers to Superman. Streaky is the first cat to be a member of the team.   

It was never confirmed which of them is the leader.

In other media
A group inspired by the Space Canine Patrol called the Dog Star Patrol appears in Krypto the Superdog, led by series original character Brainy Barker, who possesses powerful psionic powers, and consists of Tail Terrier, a female incarnation of Mammoth Mutt, Hot Dog, Tusky Husky, Bull Dog, and Paw Pooch. This version of the group are non-anthropomorphic alien canines. Additionally, Krypto, Streaky the Supercat, and Ace the Bat-Hound become members later in the series while new recruit Drooly, who can create streams of saliva and use it as projectiles and rope, and reserve member Stretch-o-Mutt, who possesses ball-like elasticity and the ability to contort his body into whatever he desires, also make minor appearances.

References

Anthropomorphic dogs
DC Comics superhero teams
Dog superheroes